Artesian Commons is a  park in downtown Olympia, Washington built in May 2014 around an artesian spring. It is described by the city as Olympia's first urban park (Sylvester Park in the Olympia Downtown Historic District is state-owned).

Drinking water supply

The free, public downtown artesian spring has long been used by Olympians for drinking water, along with other springs used to make beer brewed at Well 80 Artesian Brewing across the street from Artesian Commons; and commercial kombucha at Magic Kombucha, and beer at McMenamins Spar Café and Fish Brewing Company, all nearby in the downtown area. Artesian well water is tested by the city, along with the main city supplies at McAllister Wellfield (replacing McAllister Springs since the 2010s) and Allison Springs. Lead levels at the artesian spring in 2015 were less than 0.001 mg/L (the EPA action level is 0.015). A summer, 2016 survey of over 400 park users showed that the median user bottled between 4 and 6 gallons of their own water to take home, and was the only drinking water supply for 70% of the respondents.

Controversy and closure
The park has been controversial because of a "steady stream of problems" including its high use by homeless people, drug dealing, violence and other criminal activity. The trash generated by park users is three quarters that of a well-used  Olympia park, or 150 times greater on a per-acre basis.

The park had a paid "well host", Garrett Cooper, an Army veteran, and a park ranger charged with enforcement. In early 2016, the city applied some crime prevention through environmental design practices including fencing and lighting to deter unwanted behavior.

In August, 2018, following four years of incidents including almost 1,400 calls for police at the park, it was permanently closed. Although the park was closed, the Portland Loo and the artesian well remained accessible to the public. In closing the park, the city cited "violent incidents, verbal altercations, nuisance behaviors, and mental health emergencies". The closure was met with a September protest involving occupation of the park, in which people were arrested for trespassing and for assaulting police.

Art and folklore
The park's artesian well was decorated with public art murals by local artist Jennifer Kuhns.

An urban legend states that if one drinks artesian water from one of the over 90 artesian springs in Olympia, one will return to the city.

See also

Artesian Well Park, Salt Lake City

Footnotes

References

External links

 at Olympia Parks Department

2014 establishments in Washington (state)
Parks in Olympia, Washington
Protected areas established in 2014
Springs of Washington (state)
Water wells in the United States